The Alfa Romeo 164 (Type 164) is a four-door executive saloon manufactured and marketed by  Italian automaker Alfa Romeo from 1987-1998, styled by Pininfarina, and cooperatively designed and sharing platforms and numerous elements with the Fiat Croma, Saab 9000 and Lancia Thema. 

Predecessors of the 164 were the Alfa 90 and the luxurious Alfa 6. The 164 was followed by the 166 in 1998, after a combined production total of 273,857 units.

Development
In October 1978, Alfa Romeo, Fiat, Lancia and Saab jointly agreed to each develop an executive saloon based on their shared Type Four platform ("Tipo 4" in Italian), to eventually compete against the likes of the Ford Granada and Opel Rekord (Vauxhall Carlton) as well as more premium saloons by BMW and Mercedes-Benz in the form of the 5 Series and E-Class, respectively.

Project 164 started life as Project 156 (not to be confused with Alfa Romeo 156) and was completed in 1981, then still under Alfa Romeo. A year later, that project morphed into the 164 based on the Type Four platform. The design would later influence the rest of the Alfa Romeo range (starting in 1990 with the major redesign of the 33 and culminating with the 155.

Ultimately unveiled at the 1987 Frankfurt Motor Show, the 164 was the last model to be developed while the Alfa Romeo was still a fully independent company, and was formally launched a few months after the takeover by Fiat.

Design

Enrico Fumia of Pininfarina was responsible for the 164 design, with the first 1:1 scale model produced in 1982. Design cues were publicly revealed on the Alfa Romeo Vivace concept car, which was exhibited at the 1986 Turin Motorshow that went on to influence the design of the Alfa Romeo GTV and Spider (916 series) launched in 1994.

The 164 became the first Alfa to benefit from extensive use of computer aided design, used to calculate structural stresses that resulted in a very rigid but still relatively lightweight chassis. Although sharing the same platform as that of the Lancia Thema, Fiat Croma and Saab 9000, by virtue of the fact that it was the last of the four to enter production, it featured unique front suspension geometry and the most distinctive styling of the lot. In fact, for example, the other cars all shared identical side door panels. Though still voluminous, the 164 had the tightest aperture to the rear boot, which had a 510-Litre capacity.

Overall, the 164 also benefitted from improved build quality relative to previous Alfas, due to the extensive use of galvanised steel for the frame and various body panels for the first time in the brand's history. Moreover, the car featured advanced (but troublesome) electronics because of the most complex wiring harness fitted to any Alfa Romeo. For example: it had three onboard computers (one for air conditioning, one for instrumentation, and one for the engine management); air conditioning and instrument functions shared a multiple-mode coded Zilog Z80-class microcontroller for dashboard functioning). The instrumentation included a full range of gauges including an advanced check-panel.

Its interior was spacious and modern, available with standard velour seating or leather trim depending on the model. Its dashboard continued the avantgarde design of the exterior with a centre console that was dominated by a large number of seemingly identical buttons arranged in rows. Air-direction within the ventilation system was controlled by a pair of servomechanisms, which used fragile plastic gears.

Depending on the model, the 164 featured automatic climate control and electronically controlled damping suspension - the latter, for example, in the sports-oriented Quadrifoglio Verde ("Green Cloverleaf ") and 164S models. This suspension actively reduced damping in response to conditions to provide a dynamic compromise between road holding and comfort.

Range
The 164 was offered as a 4-door saloon, unlike the related Type Four cars that were available in other bodystyles (i.e. Croma and 9000 hatchback; 9000 and Thema sedans; Thema wagon). In addition, until 1993, the 164 was only available in front wheel drive like the related cars.

In its home market of Italy, the original 164 range launched in 1987 comprised the following models:
 2.0i Twin Spark (badged "T.SPARK")
 3.0i V6 12-valve
 2.5 Turbodiesel (badged "TD").

European export versions were fitted with catalytic converters to meet more stringent emission standards, and this included the Twin Spark Europa model.

Apart from minor running production upgrades, the range was revamped and became known as the 164 Super in 1993. Key differences on the outside consisted of chrome trimmings added to the upper edge of the bumpers bars and revised headlights now with a slimmer profile. Inside, there were revised instruments and a centre console that featured more delineated switchgear.

The range was now also bolstered by the following models:
 3.0i V6 24V with a 24-valve engine upgrade
 3.0i V6 Quadrifoglio 4 (badged "Q4"), which was the most powerful and sole all wheel drive variant built.

The 3.0-litre V6 was the only engine ever offered there, and 1995 would prove to be the last year an Alfa Romeo sedan would be sold there until the 2017 model year.

The 164 was rebadged as the 168 for the Hong Kong and Malaysian markets, as the number "164" had a very negative connotation (路死 — a Chinese homophone meaning "all the way to death"), and "168" has quite the opposite (路發 — meaning "all the way to prosperity").

Quadrifoglio Verde

The 164 QV or Quadrifoglio Verde was available from 1990 to 1992 as the top of the range model. It was fitted with a bodykit that comprised an extended front spoiler, deeper side-skirts and a deeper rear apron. Inside, the QV featured sculpted sports seats whereas, mechanically, it was fitted with an up-rated version of the 3.0-litre V6 12-valve engine and adjustable damper settings. This was the only export 164 available with a manual transmission (e.g. in Australia). From 1992, this model was the powered by the new 24-valve V6 engine.

Q4

In 1993, Alfa Romeo introduced a four-wheel-drive variant called the Q4 (short for Quadrifoglio 4), which was equipped with the most powerful 3.0-Litre V6 engine fitted to the 164, featuring 24-valves. The Q4's four-wheel-drive system ("Viscomatic") was co-developed with the Austrian company Steyr-Puch. and was more advanced than others systems offered at the time. The system consisted of a viscous coupling unit, central epicyclic differential and Torsen differential in the rear. Connected to the ABS and "Motronic" engine management modules, the power driven to the rear axle was continuously variable from 0 to 100% subject to road conditions. Torque was distributed between axles depending on the speed, turning radius, engine rpm, throttle position and ABS parametrics. This model was equipped with a Getrag 6-speed manual gearbox.

Engines

The base 164 engine was the 2.0 L Twin Spark inline-four engine with two spark plugs per cylinder. Apart from that, this engine was also notable for having a two-stage valve timing system (before Honda's VTEC), and an induction valve blade-type system, both aimed at improving low-end torque.

The block of the Twin Spark was the same 2.0 L that had been a part of Alfa's road and race car history since the 1930s. The engine featured fuel injection, controlled by a Bosch Motronic system as well as a chain-driven DOHC cylinder head, a single cooling fan and generator belt, improved reliability and reduced parasitic friction. The battery of all 164s was placed in the trunk to achieve a near 50:50 weight distribution.

Next was a turbocharged 2.0 L eight-valve engine, derived from the Lancia Thema i.e. Turbo, and including an overboost feature. This was later replaced by a turbocharged 2.0 L V6, which was based on the 3.0 L engine and was fitted with a very sophisticated engine management system from Bosch.

The top-of-the-line engine was the 3.0 L "Busso" V6 designed by Giuseppe Busso originally for the Alfa 6. Its 12-valve design was later upgraded to 24-valves for the new V6 models and, specifically, the QV and Q4.

For Europe, there was also a turbodiesel version with an engine sourced from the Italian engine maker VM Motori.

A 2.0 L V6 turbocharged engine was intended for the domestic market, due to an Italian law at the time under which cars with engine displacement over 2000 cc had a value-added tax of 38% instead of the usual 18%.

Performance

Concept cars and variants

In 1991, a shortened version of the 164 platform served as the basis of the all-wheel drive Alfa Romeo Proteo concept, which never eventuated.

The 164 also served as the basis of the Italdesign Scighera concept sports car unveiled in 1997. The Scighera sported the same 3.0-liter engine as the 164 but with 2 turbochargers.

In 1988, Alfa Romeo produced the 164 Pro-Car featuring a mid-engine layout and powered by the Alfa V1035 3.5 litre V10 engine. It was planned to race in a special racing series, as a support event to Formula One Grand Prix. With Alfa Romeo being the only manufacturer to produce a car for this series, the project was ultimately cancelled. Only one rolling chassis with the Alfa Romeo V10 was built by Motor Racing Developments Ltd., the company behind the Brabham Formula One team, which was owned by Alfa Romeo at the time.

The 164 was also the subjects of official and privately modified variants, the most notorious being:
 a 2-door "Vigili del Fuoco" (Italian for fire brigade) pick-up version now exhibited at the Alfa Romeo Museum, produced as part of the brand's practice of  supplying specially modified vehicles for use by rescue teams at racing tracks;
 a station wagon version, privately modified in North America.
 a limousine version, called the "Alfaab" and built by Top Gear in 2007. It combined the front two thirds of a 164 with the same from a Saab 9000 and was driven by host James May for a challenge in the said show.

In Italy, in particular, armoured versions were built for government officials alongside versions of the related Fiat Croma and Lancia Thema.

See also
BMW M1 Procar Championship
Alfa Romeo in Formula One

References

External links

164
Executive cars
Sedans
Front-wheel-drive vehicles
All-wheel-drive vehicles
1990s cars
Cars introduced in 1987
Pininfarina
Cars discontinued in 1998